Amphiclasta is a monotypic moth genus in the family Geometridae. Its only species, Amphiclasta lygaea, is found in Australia. Both the genus and species were first described by Alfred Jefferis Turner in 1906.

References

Nacophorini
Moths of Australia
Monotypic moth genera